Manish is a Hindu masculine given name.

Manish or Maneesh can also refer to:

 Manish (band), a Japanese power-pop band
 Serena-Maneesh, a rock band from Norway
 Serena Maneesh (album)
 XXXtra Manish, a 1994 album by Little Bruce